Daegu Science High School is a gifted school located in Daegu, South Korea. The school opened on October 26, 1987. As of 2020, it has 281 students. The school is for gifted students with talents in mathematics and sciences. The graduates of the school usually go to science or engineering schools in KAIST, Postech, Seoul National University, UNIST, and other prestigious universities in Korea and in the world.

History
October 26, 1987 – official permission of school foundation (2 classrooms, 60 students)
March 1, 1988 – the inauguration of YoungKyun Son, as the first principal
March 3, 1988 – the first entrance ceremony
February 12, 1990 – moved to a newly built school
January 28, 1991 – the first graduation ceremony (52 students)
May 30, 1992 – altering school regulations (4 classrooms per grade, 12 classrooms in total)
September 1, 2006 – the inauguration of Chunhyun Cho, as the eighth principal
December 18, 2008 – transferred to a science gifted school
February 10, 2011 – the 21st graduation ceremony (1742 early graduates in total)
March 1, 2011 – the inauguration of Soodohn Choi, as the tenth principal
March 1, 2019 – the inauguration of Changwon Seok, as the twelfth principal

References

External links
  
 

Science high schools in South Korea
High schools in South Korea
Educational institutions established in 1987
1987 establishments in South Korea